Sowmaeh (also Romanized as Şowma‘eh) is a village in Bedevostan-e Sharqi Rural District, in the Central District of Heris County, East Azerbaijan Province, Iran. At the 2006 census, its population was 208, in 42 families.

References 

Populated places in Heris County